The 1977 Maine Black Bears football team was an American football team that represented the University of Maine as a member of the Yankee Conference during the 1977 NCAA Division II football season. In its second season under head coach Jack Bicknell, the team compiled a 3–7 record (1–4 against conference opponents) and tied for last place in the Yankee Conference. Jack Cosgrove and David Secin were the team captains.

Schedule

References

Maine
Maine Black Bears football seasons
Maine Black Bears football